Myklebostad may refer to the following locations:

Myklebostad, Møre og Romsdal, a village in Molde municipality, Møre og Romsdal, Norway
Myklebostad, Bodø, a village in Bodø municipality, Nordland, Norway
Myklebostad, Tjeldsund, a village in Tjeldsund municipality, Nordland, Norway
Myklebostad, an area in Leinesfjord in Steigen municipality, Nordland, Norway

See also
Myklebustad
Mikkelbostad
Myklebost (disambiguation)
Myklebust (disambiguation)